Robert Hudson (born May 23, 1960, in Seattle, Washington), is a documentary filmmaker. He won an Academy Award in the category Documentary Short Subject for the film Mighty Times: The Children's March.

Filmography
 Rock the Boat (1998) 
 A Place At The Table (2001)
 Mighty Times: The Legacy of Rosa Parks (2002)
 Mighty Times: The Children's March (2004)

References

Living people
American film directors
1960 births
Filmmakers from Seattle